Barry Simmonds is a professional football coach, director of football, administrator and former player notable for holding senior management positions at clubs and governing bodies in the UK and abroad. As a coach he managed New Zealand Knights in the Australian A-League prior to its licence being transferred to new ownership and renamed Wellington Phoenix. He was the Director of Football Recruitment and on the Executive Board at Norwich City FC for the Premier League promotion winning 2014–2015 season. He was appointed having held a similar post at Fulham FC over several years. 
In 2017 he rejoined Crystal Palace FC. Simmonds had been engaged in previous roles at the London-based Premier League club.

Biography
He has developed a reputation for signing both undervalued lesser known players and established internationals at relatively low or no fees some of whom were sold on for much higher figures. Whilst at Fulham this included Chris Smalling and Moussa Dembele who were transferred to Manchester United and Tottenham Hotspur respectively. 
Several of the playing squad which achieved a UEFA Europa League Final place in 2010 were recruited following Simmonds' appointment. 
At Norwich City a squad overhaul including the addition of Cameron Jerome and Gary O'Neil proved decisive in achieving promotion to the Premier League. It was the second occasion Simmonds had been influential in a club gaining promotion from the Championship as the 2004 Play-Off Final winning Crystal Palace team included players signed during his tenure as Head of Recruitment.

In the 2013 award-winning book "The Nowhere Men” author Michael Calvin credited Simmonds with being a leading figure at the forefront of modern football club structure through the combined use of sports science, statistical analysis and traditional practice. Simmonds has cited the New Zealand All Blacks rugby team off-field operating methodology and American statistician Bill James as influences. Revered for his work in Major League Baseball James highlighted how undervalued players could be recruited which Simmonds saw parallels with in professional football.

Following on from Norwich City it was reported in the British media that he had been contracted by The Football Association to work as a member of England manager Roy Hodgson's staff for the national team's preparation and final tournament of the 2016 UEFA European Championship.

Managerial statistics

References

Living people
English football managers
New Zealand Knights FC
Fulham F.C. non-playing staff
Bolton Wanderers F.C. non-playing staff
Cardiff City F.C. non-playing staff
Crystal Palace F.C. non-playing staff
Queens Park Rangers F.C. non-playing staff
Oxford City F.C. players
A-League Men managers
Association footballers not categorized by position
Year of birth missing (living people)
English footballers